Hypostomus luetkeni is a species of catfish in the family Loricariidae. It is native to South America, where it occurs in the state of Rio de Janeiro in Brazil. The species reaches 25.4 cm (10 inches) SL.

References 

luetkeni
Fish described in 1877